In enzymology, a maltose synthase is an enzyme that catalyzes the chemical reaction

2 alpha-D-glucose 1-phosphate + H2O  maltose + 2 phosphate

Thus, the two substrates of this enzyme are alpha-D-glucose 1-phosphate and H2O, whereas its two products are maltose and phosphate.

This enzyme belongs to the family of glycosyltransferases, specifically the hexosyltransferases.  The systematic name of this enzyme class is alpha-D-glucose-1-phosphate:alpha-D-glucose-1-phosphate 4-alpha-D-glucosyltransferase (dephosphorylating).

References 

 

EC 2.4.1
Enzymes of unknown structure